Frank Yamma is a singer and songwriter from Central Australia. He is a Pitjantjatjara man who speaks five languages and sings in both Pitjantjatjara and English. Yamma is the son of Issac Yamma, an early artist who pioneered singing Western style songs in traditional language. He is Regarded as one of Australia's most important indigenous songwriters.

Career
In 1999, Frank Yamma & Piranpa released Playing with Fire. At the Deadly Awards 1999 it won album of the year. 

At the APRA Music Awards of 2005 Yamma won Best Original Song Composed for a Feature Film, Telemovie, TV Series or Mini-Series with David Bridie for "Pitjantjara" from The Alice.

In 2010, Yamma returned with the critically acclaimed Countryman. This album gained international attention which sparked extensive national and international touring. 

In 2014, Yamma released Uncle. In 2014, Yamma performed across Canada at Calgary Folk Festival, Vancouver Folk Festival and Winnipeg Folk Festival, where he shared the stage with Buffy Saint Marie and The Mekons, as well as performing a coveted spot opening for Joan Baez.

Discography

Studio albums

Remix albums

Compilation albums

Awards and nominations

AIR Awards
The Australian Independent Record Awards (commonly known informally as AIR Awards) is an annual awards night to recognise, promote and celebrate the success of Australia's Independent Music sector.

|-
| AIR Awards of 2015
|Uncle 
| Best Independent Country Album
| 
|-

APRA Awards
The APRA Awards are presented annually from 1982 by the Australasian Performing Right Association (APRA), "honouring composers and songwriters".

|-
| 2005 || "Pitjantjara" from The Alice (David Bridie & Frank Yamma) || Best Original Song Composed for a Feature Film, Telemovie, TV Series or Mini-Series ||

ARIA Music Awards
The ARIA Music Awards is an annual award ceremony event celebrating the Australian music industry. Yamma have been nominated for one award.

! Lost to
|-
| 2020
| Tjukurpa: The Story
| Best Blues & Roots Album
| 
| The Teskey Brothers - Live At The Forum

Deadly Awards
The Deadly Awards, commonly known simply as The Deadlys, was an annual celebration of Australian Aboriginal and Torres Strait Islander achievement in music, sport, entertainment and community.

|-
| 1999
|Playing with Fire  
| Album Release of the Year:
| 
|-

References

External links 
 NAIDOC Week 2002
 Digital Dreaming
 Rappin' to the drum of a different beat - Frank Yamma and Wicked Beat Sound System
 "Frank Yamma: a fire that burns brighter." Article by Peter Vincent in the Sydney Morning Herald. 15 October 2014. 

Indigenous Australian musicians
Living people
Australian male singers
Australian songwriters
APRA Award winners
Australian guitarists
Year of birth missing (living people)
Australian male guitarists